Robert Høneren Johansson (born 23 March 1990) is a Norwegian ski jumper. Johansson has often been nicknamed the "Wing Commander" for his distinctive handlebar  moustache.

Ski jumping career
He finished fourth in the team competition at the 2009 Junior World Ski Championships, and also competed at the 2010 Junior World Ski Championships. In January 2012 he took his first Continental Cup podium, with a third place in Neustadt, and in March 2012 he won his first Continental Cup race in Kuopio. In the World Cup he has finished once among the top 15, with a 13th place from Kuusamo in November 2013. He managed two more top-20 placements that season, with a 20th and a 19th place from Sapporo in January 2014.

At the 2018 Winter Olympics in Pyeongchang, South Korea, Johansson won bronze in both the men's normal hill individual and men's large hill individual event.

FIS Ski Flying World Championships

World Cup

Standings

Wins

Individual starts (164)

Ski jumping national record

Moustache
Johansson competed in Pyeongchang with a manicured handlebar moustache which he began growing two years earlier. The moustache attracted considerable media attention.

References

External links
 
 
 

1990 births
Living people
Sportspeople from Lillehammer
Norwegian male ski jumpers
World record setters in ski flying
Olympic ski jumpers of Norway
Ski jumpers at the 2018 Winter Olympics
Ski jumpers at the 2022 Winter Olympics
Medalists at the 2018 Winter Olympics
Olympic gold medalists for Norway
Olympic bronze medalists for Norway
Olympic medalists in ski jumping
FIS Nordic World Ski Championships medalists in ski jumping
21st-century Norwegian people